Michael Legge (born June 12, 1953) is a Massachusetts-born American B-movie filmmaker and actor. He is known for producing low-budget comedy-horror films that he writes, directs and generally stars in. He founded the production company Sideshow Cinema.

Early life 
According to Legge, he enjoyed watching the comedies of The Marx Brothers and Laurel and Hardy and was also a big fan of horror movies that were so prevalent in the 1950s/1960s. He started making movies at a young age with an 8mm movie camera and by high school was making spoofs of movies such as David Lean's Bridge on the River Kwai. Legge was writing and acting in these films, as well as shooting and editing them, with help from friends and family members.

Acting career 
Legge has won several awards as an actor, including a B-Movie Award at the B-Movie Film Festival for being the Best Villain in 1999 in his film Braindrainer. He has acted on the stage as well as on screen. In 2000, he played Dr. Wahl in The Girls from H.A.R.M.!, a film directed by Pat Bishow.

Filmmaking career 
Michael Legge's filmmaking career developed out of his love of the movies and of his own skill at making short comedies and off-the-wall films. His early movies were all shot on film. From 1970 to 1986 he made dozens of films. He continued to produce and develop films through his production company Sideshow Cinema. With his success on the festival circuit, an independent film distributor signed him up and released many of his short and feature films on video. Currently, Sub Rosa is releasing all his films.

Honey Glaze (2003) was Legge's biggest-budget film ever, and it had a successful Sub Rosa release. His comedy film Democrazy, released January 25, 2005, stars himself, Lorna Nogueira, John Shanahan, and Stacy Armstrong.

Recent films 
 Squirrels (1987), writer, producer, director, and actor
 Chat for Mrs. Order (1987), writer, producer, director, and actor
 Working Stiffs (1989), writer, producer, director, and actor
 Loons (1991), writer, producer, director, and actor
 Cutthroats (1994), writer, producer, director, and actor
 Sick Time (1995), writer, producer, director, and actor
 Potential Sins (1997), writer, producer, director, and actor
 Alien Agenda: Under the Skin (1996–1997), wrote and directed an "Alien Abductee Interviews" segment
 Stumped (1998), writer, producer, director, and actor
 Creaturerealm: Demons Wake (1998), wrote and directed "Dryer Straits" segment
 Braindrainer (1999), writer, producer, director, and actor
 The Girls from H.A.R.M! (2000), actor
 Honey Glaze (2003), writer, producer, director, and actor
 That's Independent! (2004), interviewee
 Democrazy (2005), writer, producer, director, and actor
 Dungeon of Dr. Dreck (2007), writer, producer, and actor
 My Mouth Lies Screaming (2009), writer, producer and actor
 Evan Straw (2010) writer, producer and actor
 Coffee Run (2011) writer, producer and actor

References

External links 
 
 Interview at Rogue Cinema

American male film actors
Film producers from Massachusetts
1953 births
Living people
People from Mendon, Massachusetts
Male actors from Massachusetts
Film directors from Massachusetts